William Lassell  (18 June 1799 – 5 October 1880) was an English merchant and astronomer. He is remembered for his improvements to the reflecting telescope and his ensuing discoveries of four planetary satellites.

Life

William Lassell was born in Bolton, Lancashire. He was educated first in Bolton then at Rochdale Academy. After the death of his father, he was apprenticed from 1814 to 1821 to a merchant in Liverpool. He then made his fortune as a beer brewer, which enabled him to indulge his interest in astronomy. He built an observatory at his house "Starfield" in West Derby, a suburb of Liverpool. There he had a  aperture metal mirror reflector telescope (aka the "two-foot" telescope), for which he pioneered the use of an equatorial mount for easy tracking of objects as the Earth rotates. He ground and polished the mirror himself, using equipment he constructed. The observatory was later (1854) moved further out of Liverpool, to Bradstone.

In 1846, Lassell discovered Triton, the largest moon of Neptune, just 17 days after the discovery of Neptune itself by German astronomer Johann Gottfried Galle, using his self-built instrument.
In 1848, he independently co-discovered Hyperion, a moon of Saturn. In 1851 he discovered Ariel and Umbriel, two moons of Uranus.

In 1855, he built a  telescope, which he installed in Malta because of the observing conditions that were better than in often-overcast England. On his return to the UK after several years in Malta, he moved to Maidenhead and operated his  telescope in an observatory there. The 48-inch telescope was dismantled and was eventually scrapped. The 24-inch telescope was later moved to Royal Observatory, Greenwich in the 1880s, but eventually dismantled.

Lassell was a Fellow of the Royal Astronomical Society (FRAS) from 1839, won the Gold Medal of the Royal Astronomical Society in 1849, and served as its president for two years starting in 1870.
He was elected a Fellow of the Royal Society (FRS) in 1849 and won their Royal Medal in 1858. Lassell was also a Fellow of the Royal Society of Literature (FRSL). He was furthermore elected an honorary Fellow of the Royal Society of Edinburgh (HonFRSE) and of the Society of Sciences of Upsala, and received an honorary LL.D. degree from the University of Cambridge in 1874.

Lassell died in Maidenhead in 1880 and is buried at St. Luke's Church. Upon his death, he left a fortune of £80,000 (roughly ). His telescope was presented to the Royal Observatory in Greenwich.

The crater Lassell on the Moon, a crater on Mars, the asteroid 2636 Lassell and a ring of Neptune are named in his honour. At the University of Liverpool the William Lassell prize is awarded to the student with the highest grades graduating the B.Sc. program in Physics with Astronomy each year.

See also
List of largest optical telescopes in the 19th century

References

External links

Biography and other topics
Short biography and pictures
Biography and technical detail of telescopes

1799 births
1880 deaths
People from Bolton
19th-century British astronomers
Neptune
Uranus
Saturn
Recipients of the Gold Medal of the Royal Astronomical Society
Fellows of the Royal Society
Royal Medal winners
Discoverers of moons
Presidents of the Royal Astronomical Society
Fellows of the Royal Society of Literature
Members of the Royal Society of Sciences in Uppsala